Sarri is a surname. Notable people with the surname include:

Alessio Sarri (born 1973), Italian wheelchair fencer
Maurizio Sarri (born 1959), Italian football manager
Olle Sarri (born 1972), Swedish actor
Veatriki Sarri (born 1998), Greek footballer

Italian-language surnames
Greek-language surnames